Kim Hyun-Kon (Hangul: 김현곤, Hanja: 金炫坤, born October 22, 1985, in Seoul) is a South Korean short track speed skater.

External links
 Profile from the-sports.org

1985 births
Living people
South Korean male short track speed skaters
Asian Games medalists in short track speed skating
Asian Games gold medalists for South Korea
Asian Games silver medalists for South Korea
Short track speed skaters at the 2007 Asian Winter Games
Medalists at the 2007 Asian Winter Games
World Short Track Speed Skating Championships medalists
21st-century South Korean people